Mark Pretorius (born 9 June 1992 in Nelspruit) is a South African rugby union player who most recently played for the . His regular position is hooker.

Career

Youth and Varsity rugby

He also represented them at Under-21 level in 2012 and 2013.

Senior career

Golden Lions / Lions

SWD Eagles

After 3 seasons in Johannesburg, Pretorius moved to George to join the  prior to the 2016 season.

Representative rugby

2012 IRB Junior World Championship

In 2012, he was selected in the South Africa Under-20 squad for their victorious 2012 IRB Junior World Championship campaign. In the group stages, he started in their opening match against Ireland, he was an unused substitute against Italy and came on during their match against England. He was promoted to the starting line-up for the semi-final match against Argentina and responded by scoring a 36th minute try, securing a starting position for the final against New Zealand, helping them clinch the title with a 22–16 win.

References

South African rugby union players
Living people
1992 births
People from Mbombela
Golden Lions players
Lions (United Rugby Championship) players
Rugby union hookers
South Africa Under-20 international rugby union players
Rugby union players from Mpumalanga